Social class in the United States  refers to the idea of grouping Americans by some measure of social status, typically economic. However, it could also refer to social status or location. The idea that American society can be divided into social classes is disputed, and there are many competing class systems.

Many Americans believe in a social class system that has three different groups or classes: the American rich, the American middle class, and the American poor. More complex models propose as many as a dozen class levels, including levels such as high upper class, upper class, upper middle class, middle class, lower middle class, lower class and lower lower middle class. while others disagree with the American construct of social class completely. Most definitions of a class structure group its members according to wealth, income, education, type of occupation, and membership within a hierarchy, specific subculture, or social network. Most concepts of American social class do not focus on race or ethnicity as a characteristic within the stratification system, although these factors are closely related.

Sociologists Dennis Gilbert, William Thompson, Joseph Hickey, and James Henslin have proposed class systems with six distinct social classes. These class models feature an upper or capitalist class consisting of the rich and powerful, an upper middle class consisting of highly educated and affluent professionals, a middle class consisting of college-educated individuals employed in white-collar industries, a lower middle class composed of semi-professionals with typically some college education, a working class constituted by clerical and blue collar workers whose work is highly routinized, and a lower class divided between the working poor and the unemployed underclass.

Markers

Some definitions of class look only at numerical measures such as wealth or income. Others take into account qualitative factors, such as education, culture, and social status. There is no consensus on which of these variables is essential and which are merely common correlates. It is also disputed whether sharp lines can be drawn; one point of view in the debate:

Social status

Social class is sometimes presented as a description of how members of the society have sorted themselves along a continuum of positions varying in importance, influence, prestige, and compensation. In these models, certain occupations are considered to be desirable and influential, while others are considered to be menial, repetitive, and unpleasant. (In some cases, non-occupational roles such as a parent or volunteer mentor, are also considered.) Generally, the higher the ranking on such a scale, the higher the skill and education levels required to perform it.

Some sociologists consider the higher income and prestige of higher ranked jobs to simply be incentives to encourage members of society to obtain the skills necessary to perform important work. This is an important mechanism in the economic theory of capitalism, and is compatible with the notion that class is mutable and determined by a combination of choices and opportunities.

In other cases, class or status is inherited. For example, being the son or daughter of a wealthy individual, may carry a higher status and different cultural connotations than being a member of nouveau riche ("new money") or have a planned path of positive freedom. Those taking the functionalist approach to sociology and economics view social classes as components essential for the survival of complex societies such as American society.

Income

Income in the United States is most commonly measured by United States Census Bureau in terms of either household or individual and remains one of the most prominent indicators of class status. As 82% of all households, 16% of those in the top quintiles, had two income earners the discrepancy between household and personal income is quite considerable. In 2005 the top 95% of income earners made $12,500 or more, while 18% of households had incomes over $100,000. Personal income is largely the result of scarcity. As individuals who hold higher status positions tend to possess rare skills or assume positions society deems very essential, have higher incomes. Overall the median household income was $46,326 in 2005 while the median personal income (including only those above the age of 25) was $32,140.

Per capita household income, the income a household is able to allocate to each member of the household is also an important variable in determining a given household's standard of living. A high household income may be offset by a large household size; thus, resulting in a low per capita household income. In 2005, the median household income per capita was $24,672.

In the passage above, Davis and Moore argue that income is one of the most prominent features of social class; it is not one of its causes. In other words, income does not determine the status of an individual or household but rather reflects on that status. Some say that income and prestige are the incentives provided by society in order to fill needed positions with the most qualified and motivated personnel possible.

The New York Times has used income quintiles to define class. It has assigned the quintiles from lowest to highest as lower class, lower middle class, middle class, upper middle class, and upper class. These definitions equate class with income, permitting people to move from class to class as their income changes.

Dual income controversy

Income is one of the most commonly used attributes of a household to determine its class status. The relationship between income, which mostly arises from the scarcity of a certain skill, may however, prove to be more complex than initially perceived. While the idea is that income reflects status, household income may just be the product of two or more incomes.

In 2005, 42% of American households had two or more income earners. The vast majority (77%) of households in the top quintile had two or more income earners. This means that the majority of household income in the top quintile are the result of two income earners pooling their resources, establishing a close link between perceived affluence and the number of income earners in a given household. This raises the question of whether or not the combination of incomes results in higher social status. Of course, there is no definite answer as class is a vague sociological concept.

Sociologist Dennis Gilbert states that it is possible for households to out-earn other households over higher class standing through increasing their number of income earners. He furthermore states that household size also played an essential role, as the standard of living for two persons living off one upper middle class personal income may very well be higher than that of a household with four members living off two working class personal incomes.

The combination of two or more incomes allows for households to increase their income substantially without moving higher on the occupational ladder or attaining higher educational degrees. Thus it is important to remember that the favorable economic position of households in the top two quintiles is in some cases the result of combined income, rather than demand for a single worker.

Education

Tertiary education (or "higher education") is required for many middle-class professions, depending on how the term middle class is to be defined. Tertiary education is rarely free, but the costs vary widely: tuition at elite private colleges often exceeds $200,000 for a four-year program, although financial aid may be significant. On the other hand, public colleges and universities typically charge much less, particularly for state residents.

Also, scholarships offered by universities and government do exist, and low-interest loans are available. Still, the average cost of education, by all accounts, is increasing. The attainment of post-secondary and graduate degrees is the perhaps most important feature of a middle and upper middle class person with the university being regarded as the most essential institution and gatekeeper of the professional middle class. Educational attainment is also directly linked to income.

In 2005, the vast majority of those with doctorate and professional degrees were among the nation's top 15% of income earners. Those with bachelor's degrees had incomes considerably above the national median while the median income for those with some college education remained near the national median. According to United States Census Bureau, 9% of persons aged 25 or older had a graduate degree, 27.9% had a bachelor's degree or more with 53% having attended college.

With 85% of the population having graduated from high school, it becomes apparent that the average American does not have a college degree, but is likely to have attended college for some time and has graduated from high school. Overall, educational attainment serves as the perhaps most essential class feature of most Americans, being directly linked to income and occupation.

Source: United States Census Bureau, 2005

Culture

Broadly speaking, the United States aspires to be an egalitarian country with social mobility; the American Dream includes the idea from the Declaration of Independence that "all men are created equal" and have the "unalienable right" to "Life, Liberty and the pursuit of Happiness". The phrase "second-class citizen" has a strong negative connotation in national politics. In practice, socioeconomic mobility in the United States is relatively low compared to Nordic countries and Canada, and income inequality in the United States is relatively high. Educational attainment and income are strongly correlated, but relatively low funding for K-12 schools in poor neighborhoods raises concerns about a cycle of poverty. These apparent contradictions lead to divergent views on whether American society is divided into distinct classes or should be analyzed that way.

In some American subcultures, people considered to be of a particular race, ethnicity, income range, educational background, religion, or gender are a significant majority; for example, hip-hop culture vs. preppy culture or fans of water polo vs. NASCAR.  Other subcultures are relatively diverse.

Once defined, social classes can be considered to feature their own sub-cultures, including different ways of socializing children. Due to class mobility individuals may also acculturate to the culture of another class when ascending or descending in the social order. All social classes in the United States, except the upper class, consist of tens of millions of people. Thus social classes form social groups so large that they feature considerable diversity within and any statement regarding a given social class' culture needs to be seen as a broad generalization.

Since 1970, sociologists Paula LeMasters and Melvin Kohl have set out repeatedly to research class-based cultures. Class culture has been shown to have a strong influence on the mundane lives of people, affecting everything from the manner in which they raise their children, initiation and maintenance of romantic relationship to the color in which they paint their houses. The strongest cultural differences seem to run along the professional middle class-working class divide. A recent increase in residential class segregation and the overall tendency of individual to associate mostly with those of equal standing as themselves has further strengthened class differences.

Parental views are perhaps the most essential factor in determining the socialization process which shapes new members of society. The values and standards used in child rearing are commonly closely related to the parent's occupational status. Parents from the professional class tend to raise their children to become curious independent thinkers, while working-class parents raise their children to have a more communal perspective with a strong respect for authority. Middle-class parents tend to emphasize internal standards and values while working-class parents emphasize external values.

Sociologist Dennis Gilbert uses a list of values identified by Melvin Kohn to be typical of the professional middle and working class. Middle-class parents' values for their children and themselves included: "Consideration of Others, Self-Control, Curiosity, Happiness, Honesty, Tolerance of Nonconformity, Open to Innovation...Self-Direction." This contrasted with surveyed working class individuals, who reported: "Manners, Obedience...Neatness, Cleanliness, Strong Punishment of Deviant Behavior, Stock to Old Ways, People not Trustworthy...Strict Leadership" as values for themselves and their children. There is a strong correlation between these values and the occupational activities of the respondents. The job characteristics of middle class respondents included: "Work Independently, Varied Tasks, Work with People or Data," versus working-class parents of reported "Close Supervision and Repetitive Work..."

Gender roles are also viewed differently by those in the higher and lower social classes. Middle class individuals, who were more open towards "nonconformity" and emphasized individual self-direction as well as critical thinking, were also less stringent in their application of gender roles. Working class individuals, on the other hand, emphasized gender roles. While working-class people have more and more assimilated to middle class culture regarding their view and application of gender roles, differences remain. Professional class people are more likely to have an egalitarian distribution of work in their household with both spouses being equals in heterosexual marriages. According to Dennis Gilbert, "College life, generally a prologue to upper-middle class careers, delays marriage and encourages informal, relatively egalitarian association between men and women."

Academic models
The following are reported income-, education-, and occupation-based terms for specific classes commonly used by sociologists.

Upper class

This term is applied to a wide array of elite groups existing in the United States of America. The term commonly includes the so-called "blue bloods" (multi-generational wealth combined with leadership of high society) such as the Astor or Roosevelt families. Twentieth century sociologist W. Lloyd Warner divided the upper class into two sections: the "upper-upper class" (or bourgeoisie) and "lower-upper class" (or "scoobs"). The former includes established upper-class families while the latter includes those with great wealth. As there is no defined lower threshold for the upper class it is difficult, if not outright impossible, to determine the exact number or percentage of American households that could be identified as being members of the upper-class(es).

Income and wealth statistics may serve as a helpful guideline as they can be measured in a more objective manner. In 2005, approximately one and a half percent (1.5%) of households in the United States had incomes exceeding $250,000 with the top 5% having incomes exceeding $157,000. Furthermore, only 2.6% of households held assets (excluding home equity) of more than one-million dollars. One could therefore fall under the assumption that less than five percent of American society are members of rich households. The richest 1% of the American population owns as much as the combined wealth of the bottom 90%, or perhaps even more.

Members of the upper class control and own significant portions of corporate America and may exercise indirect power through the investment of capital. The high salaries and the potential for amassing great wealth through stock options have greatly increased the power and visibility of the "corporate elite". There is disagreement over whether the "nouveau riche" should be included as members of the upper class or whether this term should exclusively be used for established families. Many sociologists and commentators make a distinction between the upper class (in the sense of those in the families of inherited wealth) and the corporate elite. By implication, the upper class is held in lower regard (as inheritors of idle wealth) than the self-made millionaires in prestigious occupations.

Inherited wealth
Yet another important feature of the upper class is that of inherited privilege. While most Americans, including those in the upper-middle class need to actively maintain their status, some upper class persons do not need to work in order to maintain their status. Status tends to be passed on from generation to generation without each generation having to re-certify its status. Overall, the upper class is financially the best compensated and one of the most influential socio-economic classes in American society.

Corporate elite
The high salaries and, especially, the potential wealth through stock options, has supported the term corporate elite or corporate class. Top executives, including Chief Executive Officers, are among the financially best compensated occupations in the United States. The median annual earnings for a CEO in the United States were $140,350 (exceeding the income of more than 90% of United States households). The Wall Street Journal reports the median compensation for CEOs of 350 major corporations was $6,000,000 in 2005 with most of the money coming from stock options.

In New York City in 2005, the median income (including bonuses) of a corporate "chief operating officer" (the No. 2 job) was $377,000. The total compensation for a "top IT officer" in charge of information technology in New York City was $218,000. Thus even below the CEO level of top corporations, financial compensation will usually be sufficient to propel households with a mere one income earner in the top 1%. In 2005 only 1.5% of American households had incomes above $250,000 with many reaching this level only through having two income earners.

Many politically powerful people make money before coming to office, but in general the political power elite have official incomes in the $150,000 to $185,000 range; members of Congress are paid $174,000, and are effectively required to have a residence in their district as well as one in Washington.

Upper middle

The upper middle class consists of highly educated salaried professionals whose work is largely self-directed. Many have advanced graduate degrees and household incomes commonly exceed the high five-figure range. Members of this class commonly value higher education – most holding advanced academic degrees – and are often involved with personal and professional networks including professional organizations. The upper middle class tends to have great influence over the course of society.

Occupations which require high educational attainment are well compensated and are held in high public esteem. Physicians, lawyers, accountants, engineers, scientists and professors are largely considered to be upper middle class. The very well educated are seen as trendsetters; the anti-smoking, pro-fitness, and organic food movements, as well as environmentalism, are largely indigenous to this socio-economic grouping. Education serves as perhaps the most important value and also the most dominant entry barrier of the upper middle class.

Sociologists Dennis Gilbert, Willam Thompson, and Joseph Hickey estimate the upper middle class to constitute roughly 15% of the population (or roughly three in every twenty persons). The hallmark of this class is its high educational attainment.

Middle class

The middle class is perhaps the most vaguely defined of the social classes. The term can be used either to describe a relative elite of professionals and managers – also called the upper middle class – or it can be used to describe those in-between the extremes of wealth, disregarding considerable differences in income, culture, educational attainment, influence, and occupation.

As with all social classes in the United States, there are no definite answers as to what is and what is not middle class. Sociologists such as Dennis Gilbert, James Henslin, William Thompson, and Joseph Hickey have brought forth class models in which the middle class is divided into two sections that combined constitute 47% to 49% of the population. The upper middle or professional class constitutes the upper end of the middle class which consists of highly educated, well-paid professionals with considerable work autonomy. The lower end of the middle class – called either lower middle class or just middle class – consists of semi-professionals, craftsmen, office staff, and sales employees who often have college degrees and are very loosely supervised.

Everyone wants to believe they are middle class. For people on the bottom and the top of the wage scale the phrase connotes a certain Regular Joe cachet. But this eagerness to be part of the group has led the definition to be stretched like a bungee cord. 

— Dante Chinni, the Christian Science Monitor

Although income thresholds cannot be determined since social classes lack distinct boundaries and tend to overlap, sociologists and economists have put forward certain income figures they find indicative of middle class households. Sociologist Leonard Beeghley identifies a husband making roughly $57,000 and a wife making roughly $40,000 with a household income of roughly $97,000 as a typical middle-class family.

Sociologists William Thompson and Joseph Hickey identify household incomes between $35,000 and $75,000 as typical for the lower middle and $100,000 or more as typical for the upper middle class. Though it needs to be noted that household income distribution neither reflects standard of living nor class status with complete accuracy.

Traditional middle class

Those households more or less at the center of society may be referred to as being part of the American middle or middle-middle class in vernacular language use. In the academic models featured in this article, however, the middle class does not constitute a strong majority of the population. Those in the middle of the socio-economic strata—the proverbial Average Joe—are commonly in the area where the working and lower middle class overlap.

The most prominent academic models split the middle class into two sections. Yet, it remains common for the term middle class to be applied for anyone in between either extreme of the socio-economic strata. The middle class is then often sub-divided into an upper-middle, middle-middle, and lower-middle class. In colloquial descriptions of the class system the middle-middle class may be described as consisting of those in the middle of the social strata. Politicians and television personalities such as Lou Dobbs can be seen using the term middle class in this manner, especially when discussing the middle-class squeeze. The wide discrepancy between the academic models and public opinions that lump highly educated professionals together in the same class with secretaries may lead to the conclusion that public opinion on the subject has become largely ambiguous.

Lower middle class
The lower middle class is, as the name implies, generally defined as those who occupy the lower portion of the middle class. People in this class commonly work in supporting occupations.

Sociologists Dennis Gilbert, William Thompson, and Joseph Hickey, however, only divide the middle class into two groups. In their class modes the middle class only consists of an upper and lower middle class. The upper middle class, as described above, constitutes roughly 15% of the population with highly educated white collar professionals who commonly have salaries in the high-5-figure range and household incomes in the low-6-figure range. Semi-professionals with some college degrees constitute the lower middle class. Their class models show the lower middle class positioned slightly above the middle of the socio-economic strata. Those in blue- and pink-collar as well as clerical occupations are referred to as working class in these class models.

Working class and lower class
Definitions of the term working class vary greatly. While Lloyd Warner found the vast majority of the American population to be in either the upper-lower class or lower-lower class in 1949, modern-day experts such as Michael Zweig, an economist for Stony Brook University, argue that the working class constitutes most of the population.

Dennis Gilbert places 13% of households among the "working poor" with 12% being in the "underclass". Thompson & Hickey place roughly 17% to 20% of households in the lower classes. The lower classes constituting roughly a fifth to a quarter of American society consists mainly of low-rung retail and service workers as well as the frequently unemployed and those not able to work. Overall, 13% of the population fall below the poverty threshold. Hunger and food insecurity were present in the lives of 3.9% of American households, while roughly twenty-five million Americans (ca. 9%) participated in the food stamp program.

Agriculture

Farm workers
Before industrialization, "yeoman farmers"—self-sufficient, politically independent landowners—made up a large portion of the country's population. Jeffersonian democracy and Jacksonian democracy successfully expanded the political rights of the yeomen, and the geographical extent of the nation to provide them farms. This culminated in the Homestead Act of 1862 which provided hundreds of thousands of free farms. Before 1865 large southern plantations used slaves. After emancipation, a system of sharecropping and tenant farming for both whites and blacks in the South provided a semi-independent status for farmers who did not own their land. In contemporary times, migrant agricultural workers—mostly Mexicans—perform field and packing work.

Farmers
Only 0.7% of the population of the United States is employed in the agricultural sector. Most are proprietors of independent farms. Once the dominant American social class, this group diminished in overall numbers during the 20th century, as farm holdings grew more consolidated, farming operations became more mechanized, and most of the population migrated to urban areas.

Today, the agricultural sector has essentially taken on the characteristics of business and industry generally. In contemporary usage, a "farmer" is someone who owns and operates a farm, which more often than not will be a sizable business enterprise; "agricultural workers" or "farm workers", who perform the actual work associated with farming, typically come out of the lower classes; indeed, they are often near-destitute immigrants or migrant farm workers. In this respect, farming mirrors big business: like any enterprise, a farm has owners (who may be a family or a corporation), salaried managers, supervisors, foremen and workers.

With the number of farms steadily diminishing, the stereotypical humble homestead is increasingly the exception, for viable farming now means agribusiness; the large amounts of capital required to operate a competitive farm require large-scale organization. The large landowners in California's Central Valley, Coachella Valley and Imperial Valley fall squarely within the upper class. Among farmers, "income" in the conventional sense is not an accurate standard of wealth measurement, because farmers typically keep their official income low by placing their assets into farming corporations rather than drawing the money directly. The stereotypical poor, marginal farmer "eking out a living" from the soil, an image deeply ingrained in most Americans' minds by folklore, films, and even history texts, has now been largely displaced by agribusiness, which has bought them out and consolidated their holdings.

Class and health

Income also has a significant impact on health as those with higher incomes have better access to healthcare facilities, higher life expectancy, lower infant mortality rate and increased health consciousness. In 2006, Harvard researchers divided the United States into "eight Americas."

Life expectancy ranges from 84.9 years for Asian-Americans who had an average per capita income of $21,566, to 71.1 years for urban African-Americans with an average per capita income of $14,800.

Furthermore, like other post-industrial nations, the United States saw increased health consciousness among persons of higher social status. Persons of higher status are less likely to smoke, more likely to exercise regularly, and be more conscious of their diet. Additionally, poorer Americans are more likely to consume lower quality, processed foods. One can therefore conclude that low socio-economic status contributes to a person's likelihood of being obese.

Class and politics

Income remains one of the main indicators of class, as it commonly reflects educational attainment as well as occupation. A frequent distinction in political attitudes can be found among individuals residing in households with differing incomes. For example, during the 2000 United States presidential election, voter turnout among those in the top 26% with household incomes exceeding $75,000 was 27% higher than the average.

Inequality and crisp definition of any existent class groupings
Some academics consider American society sociologically and economically fragmented in such a manner that no clear class distinctions can be made. This means that there are no pronounced breaks in socioeconomic strata, which makes class division highly subjective and disputable. Others, such as sociologist Dennis Gilbert, dispute the concept of a well-mixed society, and claim that distinct social networks can be identified for each class. W. Lloyd Warner also asserts the existence of class markers:

Warner asserts that social class is as old as civilization itself and has been present in nearly every society from before the Roman Empire, through medieval times, and to the modern-day United States. He believes that complex societies such as the United States need an equally complex social hierarchy.

In popular culture

The existence of class differences in American society has long been the focus of popular culture, whether in the form of books, films, or plays. Social class, for example, is a theme used in the 1948 production Mister Roberts, in a scene where the ship's captain displays resentment toward the title character, contrasting his own impoverished background to that of Roberts himself:

I think you're a pretty smart boy. I may not talk very good, Mister, but I know how to take care of smart boys. Let me tell you something. Let me tell you a little secret. I hate your guts, you college son-of-a-****! You think you're better than I am! You think you're better because you've had everything handed to you. Let me tell you something, Mister – I've worked since I was ten years old, and all my life I've known you superior bastards. I knew you people when I was a kid in Boston and I worked in eating-places and you ordered me around ... "Oh bus-boy! My friend here seems to have thrown up on the table. Clean it up, please!" I started going to sea as a steward and I worked for you then ... "Steward, take my magazine out to the deck chair!" ... "Steward, I don't like your looks. Please keep out of my way as much as possible!" Well, I took that crap! I took that for years from pimple-faced bastards who weren't good enough to wipe my nose! And now I don't have to take it any more! There's a war on, by God, and I'm the Captain and you can wipe my nose! The worst thing I can do to you is to keep you on this ship! And that's where you're going to stay! Now get out of here.

See also

American gentry
Global elite
Income inequality in the United States
Racial inequality in the United States
Social class in American history
Class: A Guide Through the American Status System
Social stratification

References

Further reading
 Leonard Beeghley; The Structure of Social Stratification in the United States Pearson, 2004
 Dennis Gilbert; The American Class Structure Wadsworth, 2002
 Rhonda Levine; Social Class and Stratification Rowman & Littlefield, 1998
Paul Fussell Class: A Guide Through the American Status System Simon & Schuster, 1992 
 Michael Zweig; What's Class Got To Do With It? Cornell University Press, 2003
 Christopher Beach; Class, Language, and American Film Comedy Cambridge University Press, 2002
 Harold J. Bershady ed; Social Class and Democratic Leadership: Essays in Honor of E. Digby Baltzell 1989
 Daniel Bertaux, and Paul Thompson; Pathways to Social Class: A Qualitative Approach to Social Mobility Clarendon Press, 1997
 Barbara Ehrenreich. Nickel and Dimed: On (Not) Getting By in America (2002), author disguises herself as working class
 David B. Grusky (Editor) Social Stratification: Class, Race, and Gender in Sociological Perspective (2000)
 Alan C. Kerckhoff; Socialization and Social Class 1972, textbook
 Jim Lardner, James Lardner, David A. Smith, editors, Inequality Matters: The Growing Economic Divide In America And Its Poisonous Consequences, WW Norton (January 2006), hardcover, 224 pages, 
 Erik Olin Wright. Classe (1997) – a detailed Marxian guide to define working class/middle class etc.
 David Popenoe, Sociology, (ninth edition, Prentice Hall, 1993  ) pb. pp. 232–236,
 Wealth, Income, and Power – wealth distribution in the United States from a Power Structure Research perspective
  – analysis from Liberal point of view
 Kalra, Paul (1996). The American Class System: Divide and Rule. .
 Kay Hymowitz / Marriage and Caste in America: Separate and Unequal Families in a Post-Marital Age (2006) 
 G. William Domhoff (1967). Who Rules America?, Englewood Cliffs, N.J.: Prentice-Hall
 Lee D. Baker (2004). Life in America: Identity and Everyday Experience, Blackwell Publishing,

External links

Working Definitions ClassMatters.com
How Class Works, The New York Times

Social class in the United States
Social status